The West Dalarna Line, is a  long railway line between Malung and the Dala Line near Borlänge, in Dalarna County, Sweden. It has only freight traffic.

History
The oldest part of the line is Repbäcken–Björbo, opened 1905. The newest is Vansbro–Malung, from 1934. Until the 1960s, the line extended to Särna about 130 km north of Malung. In 2011 the passenger traffic was discontinued because of the low track quality and the requirement to install the ERTMS signalling system into the trains, a 20 million SEK cost for the train owner (the county). Itino trains was used before then. The line is the first line in the world to get the ERTMS level 3 signalling system, which started test operation late 2010, and full operation in February 2012.

References

Railway lines in Sweden